Helena Mattsson, born March 30, 1984 in Stockholm, is a Swedish-American actress living and working in Hollywood.

Life and career
Mattsson was born on March 30, 1984 in Stockholm, Sweden and raised in the same city. She began acting at a young age, performing in plays, musicals and concerts. She studied acting at the highly selective Södra Latin upper secondary school in Södermalm, which she credits with giving her the confidence to pursue her chosen career. Mattsson had early roles in Wild Side Story and other cabarets in Stockholm. She moved to London, England, as a teenager to attend theatre school.

At the age of 19, she moved to Hollywood to audition for a TV series. Her planned short visit became permanent after she won a role the short-lived 2004 TV series Sweden, Ohio. Mattsson's accent initially held her back: "When I started working, my thick Swedish accent lost me a lot of roles. A defining point in my career definitely came when I started to lose it. I was able to play more American roles at that point, and my career took a turn for the better."

In 2007, she starred in Species: The Awakening, where she portrayed Miranda, an alien/human hybrid. She also appeared in the films You and I and Surrogates. Mattsson also appeared in the music video of Primal Scream's "Country Girl" in 2006. Her television credits include three episodes of the ABC series Desperate Housewives as Irina and in three episodes of Nikita as Cassandra Ovechkin. She played Alexis Blume in the TV series 666 Park Avenue. She appeared in a beaver costume in a Nespresso television commercial titled "Training Day" that also featured Danny DeVito and George Clooney in 2016.

Her younger sister Sofia is also an actress.

Filmography

Film

Television

References

External links 

1984 births
Swedish film actresses
Swedish television actresses
Actresses from Stockholm
Swedish expatriates in the United States
Actresses from Los Angeles
Living people
21st-century American actresses
21st-century Swedish actresses
Naturalized citizens of the United States